"I Got You" is a song by New Zealand rock band Split Enz. It was released as a single on 21 January 1980 by Mushroom Records in Australia and New Zealand, and August 1980 by A&M internationally, as the first single from their breakthrough album True Colours. Written by co-lead singer Neil Finn, who did not initially believe it to be a hit, it became the band's most commercially successful song, topping the charts in Australasia (spending eight weeks at number-one in Australia) and placing in the top 20 of the British and Canadian charts. By July 1980, it had become the biggest selling single in Australian history.

The song was rated #11 on the Australasian Performing Right Association's Top 100 New Zealand Songs Of All Time list.

Background 
"I Got You" originated from a series of songwriting sessions with his brother and co-frontman Tim, in which one brother would name a title and the other would write a song around it; Tim suggested the title "I Got You" to Neil. Speaking to the New Zealand Herald in 2001, Neil recalled: "I think Tim came up with the title. We were sitting around in Rose Bay, Sydney, writing and I remember thinking the chorus was kind of weak. But when we rehearsed it, it felt really good straight away." Initially, neither Neil, nor Michael Gudinski of Mushroom Records, believed the song would become a hit, Gudinski believing none of the tracks on True Colours had hit potential. The guitar riff at the start was played by Neil. He later remarked, "That was the only [riff] I knew how to play at the time... That was me learning how to play electric guitar."

Reception
The song received critical acclaim in contemporary music magazines. Reviewed in Roadrunner at the time of release, it was said the song "positively drips with appeal that only philistines could fail to appreciate," and asked readers to buy a copy as "it deserves to be a hit." Amanda Nicholls of Record Mirror, who also urged readers to buy the single, commented: "Good production with immaculate build-up and control throughout". Billboard noted the song's "record tenure" on the Australian charts and said American audiences would pick up on the song's "off-color, theme song appeal". Cashbox compared the song's "edgey vocals" to The Cars, and said it was "due for stateside recognition".

Music video
The music video was designed and directed by percussionist Noel Crombie, who directed most of the band's previous videos. It features Neil Finn standing in a room singing the song with the other band members performing in a framed picture on the wall behind him. The picture animates when he sings the chorus but goes still when he sings the verses. At the end of the video he is seen in the picture with the band.

Track listing
"I Got You" – 3:24
"Double Happy" – 3:15

Personnel
Neil Finn – vocals, guitar
Tim Finn – vocals
Noel Crombie – vocals, percussion
Malcolm Green – drums
Nigel Griggs – bass guitar
Eddie Rayner – keyboards

Charts

Weekly charts

Year-end charts

Cover versions
"I Got You" has been recorded by Vitamin C and The Connells.
Fleetwood Mac also played the song on their 2018-19 tour, An Evening with Fleetwood Mac, where Neil Finn replaced longtime member Lindsey Buckingham. In addition to "I Got You," Finn also performed Crowded House song "Don't Dream It's Over," with Stevie Nicks providing harmonies.

New Zealand band Shihad also released their version in 2020

Notes

Split Enz songs
1980 singles
APRA Award winners
Number-one singles in Australia
Number-one singles in New Zealand
Songs written by Neil Finn
1979 songs
Mushroom Records singles
Vitamin C (singer) songs